The 1929 Estonian Football Championship was the 9th official football league season in Estonia. Six teams, five from Tallinn and one from Tartu, took part in the league. VS Sport Tallinn won their seventh title.

League table

Top scorers

References

Estonian Football Championship
1
Estonia
Estonia